Night Song is an album by trombonist Al Grey with saxophonist Billy Mitchell released in 1963 on the Argo label.

Track listing
 "Blues in the Night" (Harold Arlen, Johnny Mercer) – 5:20
 "Stella by Starlight" (Victor Young, Ned Washington) – 6:10
 "The Way You Look Tonight" (Jerome Kern, Dorothy Fields) – 4:55
 "Through for the Night" (Trummy Young) – 4:10
 "Stardust" (Hoagy Carmichael, Mitchell Parish) – 5:20
 "Night and Day" (Cole Porter) – 4:30
 "Laughing Tonight" (Al Frisch, Roy Alfred) – 2:55

Personnel 
Al Grey – trombone
Billy Mitchell – tenor saxophone
David Burns – trumpet
Bobby Hutcherson – vibraphone
Earl Washington – piano 
Herman Wright – bass 
Otis "Candy" Finch – drums
Phil Thomas – percussion

References

1963 albums
Al Grey albums
Billy Mitchell (jazz musician) albums
Argo Records albums
Albums produced by Esmond Edwards